K.I.D.S./Fashion Delivers, Inc. is a nonprofit organization that works directly with a network of retailers, manufacturers, and licensors in various industries to provide donations of product to persons in need. The donation efforts are often focused on families dealing with illness, poverty, or victims of natural disasters. The organization was borne out of the April 2014 merger of Kids in Distressed Situations (K.I.D.S.) and Fashion Delivers.   The charity receives no government support and is among the 200 largest charities in the United States.
Though it’s K.I.D.S might be confused with KIDS.
In April 2011, K.I.D.S. was featured in the Wall Street Journal's Donor of the Day section

References

External links
 
Charities based in New York (state)